The Attachmate Group, Inc. was a privately held software holding company based in Houston, Texas in the United States. The major companies held by the group were Attachmate, NetIQ, Novell, and SUSE.

Attachmate was owned by Wizard Parent LLC—an investment group consisting of Elliott Management Corporation, Francisco Partners, Golden Gate Capital, and Thoma Cressey Bravo.

History

WRQ and Formation
In 1981, Doug Walker, Mike Richer and Marty Quinn founded Walker, Richer & Quinn (WRQ) to integrate microcomputers with existing IT environments. The company set its sights on the Hewlett-Packard market, launching the first commercially viable terminal emulator for the HP 3000.  (Two subsidiaries, Express Metrix and NetMotion Wireless, had been spun off by WRQ in 2000 and 2001, respectively, and continued to operate successfully for years to come.)

After buying both WRQ, Inc. and Attachmate Corporation, who had been long-time competitors in the host emulation business, the private equity firms announced that the companies would be merged. On June 1, 2005, the deal closed, and it was revealed that the two companies, merged into one, would be named AttachmateWRQ.

In June 2005, shortly after the merger was made official, AttachmateWRQ announced that its corporate headquarters would be located in WRQ's Seattle, Washington location.

NetIQ
NetIQ, founded in 1995 by Ching-Fa Hwang, Her-daw Che, Hon Wong, Ken Prayoon Cheng and Thomas R. Kemp, was a company that provided systems management and security management software. Their products included AppManager and Security Manager.

On April 27, 2006, AttachmateWRQ announced an agreement to acquire NetIQ  On July 5, 2006, both companies released a press release announcing the closing of the deal. The new company would do business under the name Attachmate Corporation.

OnDemand
In 2006 AttachmateWRQ acquired OnDemand Software, developer of WinINSTALL, a product similar to AttachmateWRQ's existing NetWizard product.

Two years later Scalable Software acquired the WinINSTALL business unit (substantially all assets of the former OnDemand) from Attachmate.

Wollongong
Later, the company also acquired The Wollongong Group (makers of Pathway TCP and Emissary).

Novell
In 2011 Attachmate acquired Novell, Inc and let go hundreds of Novell employees.  At this point the overseeing entity become known as The Attachmate Group.

Novell subsequently operated as two separate business units under the Novell and SUSE brand names and joined Attachmate and NetIQ as holdings of The Attachmate Group. Certain intellectual property assets are planned to be sold to CPTN Holdings, a consortium of companies led by Microsoft.

Acquisition by Micro Focus
Wizard Parent LLC was estimated to hold a 40% stake in Micro Focus following the acquisition.

In 2014-11-05, Micro Focus International announced the completion of its merger with the Attachmate Group.

In 2015-04-05, Micro Focus announced the completion of integrating Attachmate Group of companies that had been merged in 2014-11-20. During the integration period, the affected companies had been merged into a single organization. In the announced reorganization, NetIQ and Novell products would be part of Micro Focus portfolio. SUSE was sold to EQT Partners in 2019.

References

Further reading

External links
The Attachmate Group, Inc.

2014 mergers and acquisitions
Companies based in Houston
Micro Focus International
Software companies based in Texas
Software companies established in 2005
Defunct software companies of the United States